The following is a list of charter schools in New Jersey (including networks of such schools) grouped by county.

Atlantic County

 Atlantic Community Charter School
 Charter-Tech High School for the Performing Arts
 Principle Academy Charter School

Bergen County

 Bergen Arts and Science Charter School
 Englewood on the Palisades Charter School
 Teaneck Community Charter School

Burlington County

 Benjamin Banneker Preparatory Charter School
 Riverbank Charter School of Excellence

Camden County 

 Camden's Promise Charter Schools (4 schools)
 Environment Community Opportunity (ECO) Charter School
 Hope Community Charter School
 KIPP Camden (6 schools)
 LEAP Academy University Charter School
 Mastery Schools Camden (6 schools)
 UnCommon Schools Camden Prep (5 schools)

Cumberland County 

 Bridgeton Public Charter School
 Compass Academy Charter School
 Millville Public Charter School
 Vineland Public Charter School

Essex County 

 Achieve Community Charter School
 Burch Charter School of Excellence
 Discovery Charter School
 East Orange Community Charter School
 Gray Charter School
 Great Oaks Legacy Charter School
 KIPP Newark (14 schools)
 Link Community Charter School
 Maria L. Varisco-Rogers Charter School
 Marion P. Thomas Charter School
 New Horizons Community Charter School
 Newark Educators Community Charter School
 People's Prep Charter School
 Phillip's Academy Charter School Newark
 Pride Academy Charter School
 Robert Treat Academy Charter School
 Roseville Community Charter School
 UnCommon Schools North Star (14 schools)
 University Heights Charter School

Hudson County 

 BelovED Community Charter School
 Dr. Lena Edwards Academic Charter School
 Elysian Charter School
 Empowerment Academy Charter School
 Ethical Community Charter School
 Golden Door Charter School
 Hoboken Charter School
 iLearn Schools (Hudson Arts & Science)
 Jersey City Community Charter School
 Jersey City Global Charter School
 Learning Community Charter School
 Soaring Heights Charter School
 University Academy Charter High School

Mercer County 

 Achievers Early College Prep Public Charter School
 Foundation Academies (4 schools)
 International Charter School of Trenton
 Pace Charter School of Hamilton
 Paul Robeson Charter School
 Princeton Charter School
 STEMCivics
 Village Charter School

Middlesex County 

 Academy for Urban Leadership Charter High School
 Greater Brunswick Charter School
 Hatikvah International Academy Charter School
 Middlesex County STEM Charter School

Monmouth County 

 Academy Charter High School
 College Achieve Asbury
 Hope Academy Charter School
 Red Bank Charter School

Morris County 
 Unity Charter School

Ocean County 
 Ocean Academy Charter School

Passaic County 

 Classical Academy Charter School
 College Achieve Paterson
 Community Charter School of Paterson
 iLearn Charter Schools (Passaic Arts & Science, Paterson Arts & Science)
 John P. Holland Charter School
 Paterson Charter School for Science and Technology
 Philip's Academy Charter School of Paterson

Somerset County 

 Central Jersey College Prep Charter School
 Thomas Edison Energysmart Charter School

Sussex County 
 Sussex County Charter School for Technology

Union County 

 Barack Obama Green Charter High School
 College Achieve Central Charter School
 Cresthaven Academy Charter School
 Queen City Academy Charter School
 Union County TEAMS Charter School

Warren County 
 Ridge and Valley Charter School

References 

School districts
School districts